The 2008 Wyoming Cowboys football team represented the University of Wyoming in the 2008 NCAA Division I FBS football season. The team's head coach was Joe Glenn, who was in his sixth year at Wyoming. They played their home games at War Memorial Stadium in Laramie, Wyoming and competed in the Mountain West Conference.  Glenn was fired on November 23, after six seasons. Dave Christensen, the offensive coordinator from Missouri accepted the job as head coach on November 30.

Schedule

Game summaries

Ohio

In the opening game of the 2008 season, the Cowboys would down the Ohio Bobcats at home 21-20. In the first quarter, Ohio would score first on a 4-yard Theo Scott touchdown pass to Andrew Mooney, only to have to Cowboys answer with a 6-yard Devin Moore touchdown run to knot the game at 7-7 entering the second quarter. In the second, Wyoming would open the scoring with a 3-yard Dax Crum touchdown pass to J. Salyards and take a 14-7 lead. The Bobcats would answer with 10 consecutive points on a 100-yard Donte Harden kickoff return, and a 31-yard Barrett Way field goal in taking a 17-14 halftime lead. After a scoreless third, Ohio would extend its lead to 20-14 after converting a 34-yard Way field goal. The Cowboys would respond with what turned out to be the game-winning touchdown midway through the fourth on a 23-yard Crum touchdown pass to Donate Morgan to win by a final score of 21-20.

Air Force

In the Mountain West opener, the Cowboys would surrender 20 unanswered, second half points in this 23-3 loss to the Falcons. After a scoreless first, the Cowboys would respond to an Air Force field goal with a 47-yard Jake Scott field goal late in the second to tie the game at 3-3 going into the half for their only points on the afternoon.

North Dakota State

After falling behind in the third quarter by a score of 13-0 to the FCS Bison, the Cowboys would rally back with 16 unanswered points in taking a 16-13 victory at home. Midway through the third, the Cowboys would score their first points on a 2-yard Devin Moore touchdown run to close the gap to 13-7. Kicker Jake Scott would then provide the remainder of scoring on a pair of 28-yard field goals, and a third from 29-yards with only :04 seconds remaining in the contest to take the win.

BYU

With two defensive touchdowns and outgaining the Cowboys 364-273 yards in total offense, the 14th ranked BYU Cougars were dominant in this 44-0 shutout at Provo.

Bowling Green

New Mexico

Utah

TCU

San Diego State

Tennessee

UNLV

Colorado State

Coaching staff

References

Wyoming
Wyoming Cowboys football seasons
Wyoming Cowboys football